

1939
 March 14–15, 1939 Under German pressure, the Slovaks declare their independence and form a Slovak Republic. The Germans occupy the dismantled Czech lands in violation of the Munich agreement and form the Protectorate of Bohemia and Moravia.
 March 31, 1939 France and Great Britain guarantee the integrity of the borders of the Polish state.
 April 7–15, 1939 Fascist Italy invades and annexes Albania.
 August 23, 1939 Nazi Germany and the Soviet Union sign a non-aggression agreement and a secret protocol dividing eastern Europe into spheres of influence.
 September 1, 1939 Germany invades Poland, initiating World War II in Europe.
 September 3, 1939 Honoring their guarantee of Poland’s borders, Great Britain and France declare war on Germany.
 September 17, 1939 The Soviet Union invades Poland from the east. The Polish government flees into exile via Romania, first to France and then later to Great Britain.
 September 27–29, 1939 Warsaw surrenders on September 27. Germany and the Soviet Union divide Poland between them.

Source:

1940
 November 30, 1939–March 12, 1940 The Soviet Union invades Finland, initiating the so-called Winter War. The Finns sue for an armistice and cede the northern shores of Lake Ladoga to the Soviet Union. They also cede the small Finnish coastline on the Arctic Ocean.
 April 9, 1940–June 9, 1940 Germany invades Denmark and Norway. Denmark surrenders on the day of the attack. Norway holds out until June 9.
 May 10, 1940–June 22, 1940 Germany attacks western Europe, specifically France and the neutral Low Countries (Belgium, the Netherlands, and Luxembourg). Luxembourg is occupied on May 10; the Netherlands surrenders on May 14; and Belgium surrenders on May 28. On June 22, France signs an armistice agreement by which the Germans occupy the northern half of the country and the entire Atlantic coastline. In southern France, a collaborationist regime with its capital in Vichy is established.
 June 10, 1940 Italy enters the war. Italy invades southern France on June 21.
 June 28, 1940 The Soviet Union forces Romania to cede the eastern province of Bessarabia and the northern half of Bukovina to Soviet Ukraine.
 June 14, 1940–August 6, 1940 The Soviet Union occupies the Baltic states (Estonia, Latvia, and Lithuania) on June 14–18. On July 14–15, it engineers Communist coup d’états in each of these countries and then annexes them as Soviet Republics on August 3–6.
 July 10, 1940–October 31, 1940 The air war known as the Battle of Britain ends in defeat for Nazi Germany.
 August 30, 1940 Second Vienna Award: Germany and Italy arbitrate a decision on the division of the disputed province of Transylvania between Romania and Hungary. The loss of northern Transylvania forces Romanian King Carol to abdicate in favor of his son, Michael, and brings to power a dictatorship under General Ion Antonescu.
 September 13, 1940 The Italians invade British-controlled Egypt from Italian-controlled Libya.
 September 27, 1940 Germany, Italy, and Japan sign the Tripartite Pact.
 October 1940 Italy invades Greece from Albania on October 28.
 November 1940 Hungary (November 20), Romania (November 23), and Slovakia (November 24) join the Axis.

Source:

1941
 1941-06-22 Operation Barbarossa launched – Axis invasion of the Soviet Union
 1941-06-22 – Battle of the Baltic (1941) – Kreigsmarine inflicts heavy damage on the Soviet Navy
 1941-06-22 – 1941-07-09 Battle of Bialystok-Minsk – Soviet 3rd and 10th armies encircled
 1941-06-23 – 1941-06-30 Battle of Brody – Soviets lose hundreds of tanks in a staggering defeat
 1941-07-01 – German army entered Latvian capital Riga
 1941-07-10 – 1941-09-10 Battle of Smolensk – Soviet 16th and 20th armies encircled with over 300,000 troops
 1941-07-15 – 1941-08-08 Battle of Uman (1941) Battle of Western Ukraine – destruction of Soviet tank armies
 1941-08-08 – 1941-09-19 Battle of Kiev – Soviet Southwestern Front encircled with over 600,000 red army troops, which will later be known as the largest encirclement in the world
 1941-09-08 – 1944-01-18 Siege of Leningrad – the city of Leningrad and armies of the Leningrad Front encircled, deadliest siege in history
 Operation Silver Fox German and Finnish forces advance north of Leningrad on Murmansk
 Battle of Roslavl
 1941-10-24 – 1942-01-07 Operation Typhoon – German advance on Moscow
 1941-10-21 – 1941-10-27 Battle of Rostov – Germans initially occupied Rostov but were over-extended and driven back along shore of Sea of Azov by the Red Army
 Battle of Vyazma-Bryansk— see Battle of Moscow
 1941-10-10 – Battle of Vyazma – occupied by Germans
 1941-10-06 – Battle of Bryansk – occupied by Germans
 1941-10-02 – 1942-01-07 Battle of Moscow – Operation Typhoon stalls. Soviet Winter counter-offensive
 Crimean Campaign – eight-month-long campaign by Axis forces to conquer the Crimea peninsula
 First Battle of Kharkov— Germans occupy Kharkov
 1941-11-16 – 1942-07-04 Siege of Sevastopol – Crimea is occupied by the Germans
  1941-12-05 - 1942-04-30 Winter Campaign of 1941–1942 – Massed Soviet troops are able to push the overextended Germans back all along the front (seeBattle of Moscow)

1942
 January–April Rzhev-Vyazma Offensive (1942) – disastrous Soviet attempt to cut off the Rzhev salient
 1942-02-08 Demyansk Pocket – 100,000 German troops surrounded, but saved by air supply and are able to break out
 1942-05-12 – 1942-05-30 Second Battle of Kharkov – The Soviet spring offensive to re-take the city that ended in encirclement by elements of the 6th Army and 1st Panzer Army
 1942-06-28 Operation Blue –  The Axis summer offensive to capture the oil fields in the Caucasus. Later on the goal of capturing Stalingrad was added.
 1942-06-28Battle of Voronezh (1942) – Voronezh taken by the advancing Germans
 July First Rzhev-Sychevka Offensive – Soviets fail again at Rzhev and suffer heavy losses
 1942-07-23 – 1943-02-01 Battle of the Caucasus – German troops climb Mount Elbrus but Axis cannot fight their way through to the Caspian Sea oilfields
 1942-08-23 – 1943-02-02 Battle of Stalingrad – Bloodiest battle in history
 1942-11-19 Operation Uranus launched – Romanian 3rd and 4th armies destroyed; 300,000 Axis troops trapped at Stalingrad
 November–December Second Rzhev-Sychevka Offensive – another disastrous Soviet attempt to cut off Rzhev salient; Georgy Zhukov's worst defeat
 1942-12-12 – 1942-12-29 Operation Winter Storm – fails to relieve Stalingrad
 1942-12-15 – 1943-02-25 Operation Saturn – Soviet offensive destroys the Axis position in the Caucasus and Donbas

1943
 March Rzhev-Vyazma Offensive (1943) – Rzhev finally evacuated by the Germans
 1943-02-16 – 1943-03-15 Third Battle of Kharkov – Erich von Manstein traps over-extended Red Army
 1943-07-05 – 1943-08-01 Battle of Kursk – Massed German units defeated by defense in depth
 1943-07-30 Battle of the Mius
 August Battle of Belgorod
 August Fourth Battle of Kharkov
 Battle of Smolensk (1943) – Smolensk retaken by a large Soviet Offensive
 September–November Battle of the Dnieper – Soviet forces push up to the Dnieper River and take some bridgeheads
 October Battle of Lenino
 November Battle of Kiev
 December–August 1944 Dnieper–Carpathian Offensive – The Soviets break out of their beachheads on the Dnieper and advance towards the Carpathian Mountains; Ukraine is liberated.

1944
 January – Korsun Pocket
 1944-01-18 – Siege of Leningrad raised
 1944-01-14 – 1944-03-01 – Leningrad-Novgorod Strategic Offensive
 1944-04-08 – 1944-05-12 – Battle of the Crimea
 February–July – Battle of Narva – Soviet Leningrad-Novgorod Strategic Offensive brought to a halt by German forces including Estonian conscript formations
 June–August – Operation Bagration – destruction of German Army Group Centre
 July–August – Lvov-Sandomir Offensive – destruction of German Army Group South
 July – Soviet Narva Operation – Soviet capture of Narva town
 1944-07-26 – 1944-08-12 – Battle of Tannenberg Line – Soviet advance to Tallinn harbour brought to a halt by German forces
 August – Operation Iassy-Kishinev (German "Operation Jassy-Kischinew") – defeat of German forces in Romania and switching of sides of Romania
 1944-08-23 – In a coup led by young King Michael, a pro-Allied government ousts the pro-Nazi regime of Romania and declares war on Germany
 August–September – Warsaw Uprising – failed due to lack of outside support
 1944-08-29 – 1944-10-28 – Slovak National Uprising – Failed coup of Slovak-Soviet irregular forces in Slovakia
 August–October – Battle of the Baltic (1944) – German Army Group North trapped in Courland
 1944-09-19 – Soviet Union signs Moscow Armistice with Finland
 1944-10-06 – 1944-10-28 – Battle of Debrecen – German Army Group Fretter-Pico surrounded and destroyed Soviet Mobile Group Pliyev of the 2nd Ukrainian Front
 1944-10-16 - 1944-10-30 - Gumbinnen Operation (First East Prussian Offensive) - Soviet forces unsuccessfully try to advance into East Prussia after the Battle of Memel 
 October – Battle of Belgrade
 1944-12-29 – 1945-02-13 – Battle of Budapest

1945
 1945-01-12 – 1945-02-02 – Vistula-Oder Offensive – Soviet advance from Poland to deep within the borders of Germany (seen from the location of the borders then)
1945-01-13 – 1945-04-25 – Second East Prussian Offensive – Soviet forces advance in East Prussia and besiege Königsberg.
 1945-02-02 – 1945-02-24 – Lower Silesian offensive
 1945-02-13 – 1945-05-06 – Siege of Breslau
 1945-03-06 – 1945-03-17 – Lake Balaton Offensive – Last German offensive of the war
 1945-03-15 – 1945-03-31 – Upper Silesian offensive
 1945-04-02 – 1945-04-13 – Vienna Offensive – Soviets break into Austria and take Vienna
 1945-04-16 – 1945-04-19 – Battle of the Seelow Heights – Zhukov's costly frontal assault on Berlin
 1945-04-16 – 1945-05-02 – Battle of Berlin – Nine days of street-by-street fighting
 1945-04-24 – 1945-05-01 – Battle of Halbe – Elements of German 9th Army escape to the west
 1945-04-30 – Death of Adolf Hitler
 1945-05-07 – Unconditional surrender of Germany in Rheims
 1945-05-08 – End of World War II in Europe
 1945-05-06 – 1945-05-11 – Prague Offensive
 1945-05-08 – 1945-05-09 – Liberation of Bornholm

See also
 List of Military operations on the Eastern Front European Theater during WW2
 Strategic operations of the Red Army in World War II
 Timeline of the Second World War

Notes and references

Eastern Front (World War II)
Chronology of World War II